Roy Elliott Clark (May 11, 1874 – November 1, 1925) was an outfielder in Major League Baseball. Nicknamed "Pepper", he played for the New York Giants in 1902. He also went to college at Brown University.

External links

1874 births
1925 deaths
Major League Baseball outfielders
New York Giants (NL) players
Baseball players from New Haven, Connecticut
Bridgeport Orators players
Toledo Mud Hens players